The Bakehouse is a historical bakehouse in Dirmstein, Rhineland-Palatinate, Germany, designated as an item of the  cultural heritage.

In late  1990s, this 300-year building was acquired, restored, and expanded by a France-born couple François and Marie-Colette Sagnier.

References

Buildings and structures in Bad Dürkheim (district)
Tourist attractions in Rhineland-Palatinate
Heritage sites in Rhineland-Palatinate